Bite Club may refer to:

Bite Club (comics), a Vertigo comic book mini series created by Howard Chaykin and David Tischman
Bite Club (TV series), an Australian crime thriller television series